Klári Katona (born 20 October 1953) is a Hungarian pop singer.

Career
Katona was born on 20 October 1953 in Ráckeve, Hungary. She began singing in 1966, at the age of 13, with her professional career beginning in 1972 after the performance of her song "Bővízű forrás" on the Hungarian television programme Táncdalfesztivál won her an award. She provided vocals for the song "Kék Csillag" by the band Neoton Família, then pursued a solo career. In 1976, she gave concert in Istanbul, Palma de Mallorca, and the musical festival of Sopot. The year 1977 marked the release of her first studio album, Savanyú a csokoládé backed by Ferenc Demjén and Bergendy.

Her real success came in the 1980s with composer backing of Gábor Presser and Dusán Sztevanovity. She appeared as a host on several Hungarian television channels. In 1995, she received the Order of the Hungarian Republic Small Cross.

Discography
 Savanyú a csokoládé (1977)
 Láthatod: Boldog vagyok (1978)
 Titkaim (1981)
 IV. (1984)
 Éjszakai üzenet (1986)
 Mozi (1989)
 ...Neked (1992)
 Fekete gyöngy (1996)
 Most (2001)
 Ünnep (2002)
 Éjszakai üzenet (2004)

See also
 Hungarian pop

Sources
  Biography on the Hungarian Musical Database

External links
 zeneszoveg.hu/performer.php?pc=141 Lyrics on zeneszoveg.hu
 
 
 

1953 births
Living people
20th-century Hungarian women singers
Hungarian pop singers
People from Ráckeve